Fond du Lac County Airport  is a county-owned public-use airport located 1 mile (2 km) west of the central business district of Fond du Lac, Wisconsin, a city in Fond du Lac County, Wisconsin, United States. It is included in the Federal Aviation Administration (FAA) National Plan of Integrated Airport Systems for 2021–2025, in which it is categorized as a regional general aviation facility. The airport is home to EAA chapter 572.

Facilities and aircraft 
Fond du Lac County Airport covers an area of 586 acres (237 ha) at an elevation of 808 feet (246 m) above mean sea level. It has two runways: 18/36 is 5,941 by 100 feet (1,811 x 30 m) with an asphalt surface and 9/27 is 3,602 by 75 feet (1,098 x 23 m) with an asphalt surface.

The airport has one FBO, the Fond du Lac Skyport.

For the 12-month period ending August 10, 2020, the airport had 63,200 aircraft operations, an average of 173 per day: 95% general aviation, 5% air taxi and less than 1% military.

In January 2023, there were 53 aircraft based at this airport: 49 single-engine, 3 multi-engine and 1 jet aircraft.

EAA AirVenture 
The airport, along with Appleton International Airport in Greenville, is an alternative to flying into Wittman Regional Airport during EAA AirVenture Oshkosh. Every year the FAA sets up and operates a temporary air traffic control tower during the event.

Shuttle buses run between the AirVenture grounds and the airport frequently.

See also
List of airports in Wisconsin

References

External links 
 

Airports in Wisconsin
Buildings and structures in Fond du Lac County, Wisconsin